Krishna Mandir is a 17th-century Shikhara-style temple built by King Siddhi Narsing Malla. It is located at the Patan Durbar Square, a UNESCO World Heritage Site. It was damaged by the Nepal earthquake of April 2015, and was later restored in 2018.

References

External links 

 

Lalitpur District, Nepal
Patan Durbar Square
Hindu temples in Lalitpur District, Nepal
17th-century establishments in Nepal